Dasmunsi is a surname. Notable people with the surname include:

Deepa Dasmunsi (born 1960), Indian politician
Priya Ranjan Dasmunsi (born 1945), Indian politician

Indian surnames